The following list of fictional musteloids is subsidiary to the list of fictional animals. This includes weasels, ferrets, minks, otters, martens, skunks, raccoons, and red pandas.

Fictional badgers are instead found within the list of fictional badgers.

Fictional raccoons are found in the list of fictional raccoons.

If a character appears in more than one medium, it is sorted under the primary one. Thus, despite occasional appearances in licensed video games, Pepé Le Pew is listed under the List of fictional musteloids in animation.

Comics

Film and television

Note: Ferrets appear as companions of at least two characters in the Harry Potter film series, but they are not explicitly named. An unnamed ferret also appears in the Prancing Pony in The Lord of the Rings: The Fellowship of the Ring.

Animation

Literature

Note: The Ferret Chronicles has dozens of named ferret characters not listed here, and the Redwall series (between
the books and the television show) has hundreds of ferret, stoat, and weasel characters not listed here. Only a few key ones
are listed from each. For the former see the books referenced above. For the latter, see the character lists provided within the Redwall section.

Video games

Fictional species

Advertisement
 Otter Pops
Sally Sashay, a disco singing skunk from Chuck E. Cheese's Pizza Time Theatre.

References

 Fictional
Mustelids
 
Mustelids